Ancistrosporella is a genus of lichen-forming fungi in the family Roccellaceae. The genus was circumscribed in 1995 by Swedish lichenologist Göran Thor, with Ancistrosporella australiensis assigned as the type species.

Species
, Species Fungorum accepts six species of Ancistrosporella:
 Ancistrosporella australiensis 
 Ancistrosporella curvata 
 Ancistrosporella gracilior 
 Ancistrosporella leucophila 
 Ancistrosporella onchospora 
 Ancistrosporella psoromica  – Venezuela

References

Roccellaceae
Arthoniomycetes genera
Lichen genera
Taxa described in 1995